SQN or Sqn may refer to:
 sine qua non, a Latin legal term
 Sine Qua Non (wine), a California winery
 Squadron (disambiguation), for which Sqn is a common abbreviation